Madagascar has a small Jewish population, but has never been home to a significant Jewish presence. According to the Jewish Telegraphic Agency, a vast majority of Malagasies believe they are descended from Jews. However, no statistics back up the JTA’s claim. Indeed for centuries there was a widespread belief that Madagascar had been settled by Jews since ancient times and there was speculation that the island was associated with ancient Ophir. 17th century French governor Étienne de Flacourt reported that a group known as the Zafy Ibrahim in the vicinity of the island of Nosy Boraha were of Jewish descent. By the nineteenth century a considerable literature had been produced in proof of this. Genetic research hasn't been able to corroborate their stories, instead showing that the first people to settle on the island were of Malayo-Indonesian origin, explained Nathan Devir, an associate professor of Jewish studies at the University of Utah, who has studied the group since 2012. Later, African Bantu migrants also settled on the island. Communities have been forming in Madagascar in recent years and have been slowly growing throughout the region.

After France colonized the island and Europeans began settling there in the 19th century, a small number of Jewish families settled in Madagascar, but did not establish a Jewish community.

In the summer of 1940, the Madagascar Plan was proposed by the Nazis, under which 4 million European Jews would be forcibly relocated there. The plan ultimately became unfeasible, and was scrapped.

When Madagascar gained independence as the Malagasy Republic in 1960, Israel was one of the first countries to recognize its independence and send an ambassador. Relations between both countries are close and friendly.

The country continues to be home to a tiny Jewish population, and there is a small trickle of aliyah to Israel from Madagascar. A small community of Malagasies began practicing Judaism in 2010, and three separate communities formed, each embracing a different wave of Jewish spiritual practice. Many of those who converted previously belonged to Messianic Jewish congregations, which incorporate elements of rabbinic Judaism but retain belief in Jesus. Community members searched for religious resources about Judaism online and ultimately came in contact with Kulanu, a Jewish outreach group that has organized group conversions elsewhere. In May 2016, 121 members of the Malagasy Jewish community were converted in accordance with traditional Jewish rituals; appearing before a beit din and submerged in a mikvah. The conversion, organized with the help of Kulanu, was presided over by three Orthodox rabbis.

See also
Madagascar Plan

External links
https://www.jewishvirtuallibrary.org/jsource/vjw/Madagascar.html

References

Jews
Madagascar
Madagascar
Madagascar
Judaism
Madagascar
Israel–Madagascar relations
Jewish Madagascar history